David Tuthill Jennings (June 8, 1952 – June 19, 2013) was an American professional football player who was a punter in the National Football League (NFL) from 1974 to 1987. He played for the New York Giants and the New York Jets. He later worked as a radio color commentator for Jets and Giants games until 2007. He died of complications with Parkinson's disease in 2013.

Life and career 

Jennings played both college football and college basketball and graduated from St. Lawrence University in 1974. As a high school student, he did not play football. He lettered in both football and basketball at St. Lawrence, and was inducted to the St. Lawrence Saints hall of fame in 1988.

After graduating from St. Lawrence, Jennings was not drafted, and briefly signed with the Houston Oilers as a practice squad member until he was released and recruited to the New York Giants as a free agent. He played for the Giants from 1974 to 1984, and then moved to play for the New York Jets from 1984 to 1987. During his professional career, he went to the 1978, 1979, 1980, and 1982 Pro Bowl games. He also led the league for total punts in the 1979 season, and in punting yards in both the 1979 and 1980 seasons. He retired after the 1987 season.

After his career playing professional football, Jennings began work as a radio color commentator. He commented on Jets games from 1988 to 2001 for New York sports radio station WFAN. He then moved to commenting on Giants games from 2002 until 2007, when he was replaced by former Giants linebacker Carl Banks. During this time, Jennings worked as a game analyst alongside fellow WFAN Giants announcers Bob Papa and Dick Lynch. In addition to his booth work, Jennings was a part of the Giants pre- and post-game shows, covering player interviews from the locker room. 

Dave Jennings was diagnosed with Parkinson's disease in 1995, and publicly revealed his condition in  2005. It was speculated around when he retired from broadcasting in 2008 that fatigue due to Parkinson's may have been the cause of his change in broadcasting roles and eventual retirement. He was inducted into the Giants' Ring of Honor in 2011 as one of the best punters in the franchise's history. Jennings died due to complications with Parkinson's on June 19, 2013, eleven days after his 61st birthday.

References

1952 births
2013 deaths
American football punters
New York Giants announcers
New York Giants players
New York Jets announcers
New York Jets players
National Conference Pro Bowl players
National Football League announcers
St. Lawrence Saints football players
Players of American football from New York City
Neurological disease deaths in New Jersey
Deaths from Parkinson's disease